Gibraltar is a former settlement in Union County, North Carolina, United States. It was named for the British territory of Gibraltar.

References

Geography of Union County, North Carolina
Ghost towns in North Carolina